Nathaniel "Nate" Rathbun (born January 11, 1992), better known under his stage name Audien, is a Grammy-nominated American DJ, record producer and musician. He produces progressive house, trance, electro house, and trap music.

History 

Audien hails from Mystic, Connecticut, to a musical household. His mother is a jazz aficionado. In 2008, he was introduced to electronic dance music through trance songs in video game soundtracks. Fascinated by the sound of trance, he learned to recreate songs from Armin Van Buuren's A State of Trance podcasts.

At age 17, Audien was first signed to Dutch producer and DJ Ferry Corsten's label Flashover Recordings. The label released Audien's first single, "Rise & Shine".

Musical career 

Audien has released many singles and remixes for electronic record labels including Enhanced, Perceptive, Armada, Black Hole, and Nervous. His tracks have appeared on Corsten's Countdown, Tiësto's Club Life, Above & Beyond's Trance Around The World, and Armin van Buuren's A State of Trance compilations.

In 2012, Audien began to include elements of progressive house into his music with the release of "These Are The Days". Audien's August 2012 release "Eventide", is noted for being played by Above & Beyond during their DJ set at the 2012 Electric Daisy Carnival in Las Vegas. Audien's track "Sup" was featured by Dutch icon Hardwell on episode 87 of Hardwell on Air.
In 2013, Above & Beyond premiered Audien's track "Wayfarer" as the first song ever played on Above & Beyond Group Therapy.

In 2014, Audien played at Tomorrowland.

In 2015, Audien signed to Astralwerks and released his debut EP called 'Daydreams' with the track "Rooms". He received a 2015 Grammy Nomination for Best Remixed Recording, Non-Classical for his remix of the Bastille (band) song, "Pompeii". On March 2, 2015, Audien released the single "Insomnia". "Insomnia" peaked at number one on the US Dance Charts. His 2015 track "Something Better" featuring Lady Antebellum cracked the Billboard Top 40 in Pop Songs marking Audien's first appearance on a pop chart. The track had already gone to number 1 on Billboard's Dance Club Songs chart on September 26, 2015. In 2015, Audien announced his 'Audacity' Tour  and played music festivals EDC Vegas, EDC Brazil, TomorrowWorld, and Electric Zoo.

In 2016, Audien performed at Lollapalooza's 25th year. Audien released "Crazy Love" featuring Deb's Daughter in August 2016. The track hit #1 on the Mediabase Dance Airplay Chart twice.

In 2017, Audien and MAX released the track "One More Weekend". In January 2017, Audien's US Tour "Feels Trip" was announced. Audien was on the lineup for Electric Zoo 2017. On 18 June 2017, Audien collaborated with 3LAU to produce "Hot Water", which is a trap-influenced track fusing melodic & heavy components. On 15 September 2017, Audien released his debut EP titled Some Ideas on label Astralwerks. The three-track EP contains a variety of genres, including "Rampart" which is a collaboration with hardstyle producer Gammer and "Message" whose sounds are based on his older Anjunabeats releases.

Audien returned to Anjunabeats on 13 July 2018 with his release of "Higher" through the label, followed by "Never Letting Go" with Arty on 9 November 2018.

Residences
Audien has had Las Vegas residences at Marquee in 2015, and at Encore Las Vegas's XS Nightclub and Encore Beach Club in 2016.

During the summer of 2017, Audien received a Las Vegas residency at Drai's Beachclub and Nightclub.

Discography

Studio albums
 Escapism (2019)

See also
 List of artists who reached number one on the US Dance chart

References 

1992 births
Living people
American DJs
Progressive house musicians
People from Mystic, Connecticut
Record producers from Connecticut
Electronic dance music DJs
Anjunabeats artists
Astralwerks artists
Armada Music artists
American trance musicians